See Jeran for the rune.
Jera is a village in Allahabad, Uttar Pradesh, India. Jera is a village under Prayagraj, Uttar Pradesh, India . It is almost 60 km away from Prayagraj city. This village has various category of communities
There are various persons working in government job. Suneel Kumar Sonker is working as Technical Manager in reputed Software 
MNC industry.Election Commission data, retrieved on 26 August 2010</ref>

References

Villages in Allahabad district